This is a list of deputies elected to the Syrian parliament of 2020-2024. The Syrian parliamentary election was held on 13 April 2020.

Members

Damascus Province 
Damascus Province was allocated 29 seats:

Rif Dimashq Governorate 
Rif Dimashq was allocated 19 seats:

Daraa Province 
Daraa Province was allocated 10 seats:

As-Suwayda Governorate 
As-Suwayda Governorate was allocated 6 seats:

Homs Province 
Homs Province was allocated 23 seats:

Hama Province 
Hama Province was allocated 22 seats:

Hasakah Province 
Hasakah Province was allocated 14 seats:

Deir ez-Zor Province 
Deir ez-Zor was allocated 13 seats:

Raqqa Province 
Raqqa Governorate was allocated 8 seats:

Aleppo Province 
Aleppo Province was allocated 32 seats:

Aleppo City 
Aleppo was allocated 21 seats:

Idlib Province 
Idlib Province was allocated 18 seats:

Latakia Province 
Latakia Province was allocated 17 seats:

Tartus Province 
Tartus Governorate was allocated 13 seats:

Quneitra Province 
Quneitra Governorate was allocated 5 seats:

See also 

 Parliament of Syria
 Elections in Syria
 Politics of Syria

References 

 1961
Parliament, members, 1961
 Parl
Syria